

Japanese Awards

International Awards

References

Urawa Red Diamonds
Urawa Red Diamonds